Gusinoye Ozero may refer to:
Lake Gusinoye, a lake in the Republic of Buryatia, Russia
Gusinoye Ozero (rural locality), a rural locality (a selo) located on that lake